The men's triple jump at the 2018 European Athletics Championships took place at the Olympic Stadium on 10 and 12 August.

Records

Schedule

Results

Qualification

Qualification: 16.75 m (Q) or best 12 performers (q)

Final

References

Triple Jump
Triple jump at the European Athletics Championships